Inarimachi or Inari-machi is the name of the following stations:
Inarimachi Station (Toyama), a train station in Toyama Prefecture operated by the Toyama Chihō Railway.
Inari-machi Station (Hiroshima), a tram station in Hiroshima Prefecture operated by Hiroden.